The 1977 Chilean International was a men's tennis tournament played on outdoor clay courts in Santiago, Chile. It was the second edition of the tournament and was held from 14 November through 20 November 1977. The tournament was part of the 1 Star tier of the Grand Prix tennis circuit. First-seeded Guillermo Vilas won the singles title.

Finals

Singles
 Guillermo Vilas defeated  Jaime Fillol 6–0, 2–6, 6–4
 It was Vilas' 14th singles title of the year and the 33rd of his career.

Doubles
 Jaime Fillol /  Patricio Cornejo defeated  Henry Bunis /  Paul McNamee 5–7, 6–1, 6–1

References

External links
 ITF tournament edition details

Chilean International
1977 in Chilean sport